Tucker Creek may refer to:

Tucker Creek (Castor River), a stream in Missouri
Tucker Creek (Oregon County, Missouri), a stream in Missouri